Five Nights is a 1915 British silent romance film directed by Bert Haldane and starring Eve Balfour, Thomas H. MacDonald and Sybil de Bray. It was based on a novel of the same title by Victoria Cross.

Cast
 Eve Balfour as Viola 
 Thomas H. MacDonald as Trevor Lonsdale 
 Sybil de Bray as Suzee 
 Tom Coventry as Hop Lee

References

Bibliography
 Low, Rachael. The History of British Film, Volume III: 1914-1918. Routledge, 1997.

External links

1915 films
1910s romance films
British silent feature films
British romance films
Films directed by Bert Haldane
British black-and-white films
1910s English-language films
1910s British films
English-language romance films